John Rodgers (August 8, 1812 – May 5, 1882) was an admiral in the United States Navy. He began his naval career as a commander in the American Civil War and during his Postbellum service became an admiral.

Early life and career
Rodgers, a son of the famous Commodore John Rodgers, was born near Havre de Grace, Maryland. He received his appointment as a midshipman in the Navy on April 18, 1828. Service in the Mediterranean on board  and  opened his long career of distinguished service, and he commanded an expedition of Naval Infantry and Marines in Florida during the Seminole Wars. In the mid-1850s he succeeded Commander Ringgold in command of the North Pacific Exploring and Surveying Expedition, which added greatly to the knowledge of far eastern and northern waters.  Following his promotion to commander in 1855, he married and settled to work in the Navy's Japan Office in Washington, D.C., where he was serving when the Civil War broke out.

Civil War service
Commander Rodgers' first war assignment was to go with Commodore Louis M. Goldsborough to Gosport Navy Yard on April 20, 1861, where with other officers he was to remove Naval vessels and assets so they could not be used by the Confederates. Virginia had only just declared her secession from the Union. Commodore Goldsborough made the decision to destroy the yard, and Commander Rodgers and Army Captain of Engineers Horatio G. Wright were given the job of destroying the drydock. They were thwarted in this attempt when the fuse was extinguished by water in the pumping gallery. Commander Rodgers and Captain Wright were captured by General William B. Taliaferro of the Virginia State Militia, but since Virginia had not yet joined the Confederate States, and was therefore not at war against the United States, Governor John Letcher returned the two officers to Washington.

Commander Rodgers was then sent to the Western Rivers, where he organized the Western Flotilla and supervised construction of the City-class gunboats, the first ironclad gunboats on the western rivers. He was relieved by Captain Andrew Hull Foote, a more senior officer being required by the Navy to deal with the prickly Major General John C. Fremont. He commanded the James River Flotilla, including the USS Galena, the ironclad , and the 90-day gunboat  in an expedition up the James River in May 1862, which was stopped eight miles shy of Richmond by Confederate fortifications at Drewry's Bluff. The damage that the Galena suffered in the ensuing battle caused him to report, "We demonstrated that she is not shotproof", and made him disdainful of trying experiments in the fires of war. Thereafter he supported General McClellan's Peninsula Campaign with Naval bombardment, preventing Confederate forces from overrunning the Army of the Potomac's position.

John Rodgers was promoted to captain July 16, 1862 and took command of the ironclad monitor .  After successfully navigating her from Brooklyn to Charleston through the same storm that sank the USS Monitor, he distinguished himself during the attack on Fort Sumter in May 1863, and in capturing the Confederate ram Atlanta on June 17, 1863. The latter service won him the Thanks of Congress and promotion to commodore.  Unfortunately, this was his last active service in the Civil War.  After recovering from an illness, he took command of the ironclad monitor .  Design and construction problems with that vessel kept him occupied for the remainder of the war, though he earnestly desired a more active post.

Postbellum career

Commodore Rodgers then commanded the Boston Navy Yard until 1869. He was elevated to rear admiral in December 1869 and given command of the Asiatic Squadron. In 1871 he commanded the American squadron in the United States expedition to Korea.  Returning to the United States, he assumed command of Mare Island and later served as president of the United States Naval Institute from 1879 to 1881. Rear Admiral Rodgers died in Washington, D.C., on May 5, 1882, while serving as the superintendent of the United States Naval Observatory. He was buried at Oak Hill Cemetery in Washington, D.C.

Namesake
Rodgers' father was Commodore John Rodgers (1772–1838), and he was the grandfather of pioneering Naval aviator Commander John Rodgers (1881–1926).

Family 
He was the father of William L. Rodgers, who became an Vice Admiral in the U.S. Navy.  

His brother, Robert Smith Rodgers, served as a colonel in the Union Army during the American Civil War and was married to Sarah C. Perry who was the daughter of Commodore Matthew C. Perry.  His nephew, John Augustus Rodgers (1848-1933) (son of Robert), entered the Navy as a Midshipman in 1863 and retired as a Rear Admiral in 1910.

See also

Calbraith Perry Rodgers
 Bibliography of Naval history of the American Civil War

References

General references
Robert Erwin Johnson, Rear Admiral John Rodgers, 1812–1882. Annapolis: Naval Institute Press, 1967.

External links

 
The Meigs Family papers  at Hagley Museum and Library contain a series of correspondence between Louisa Rodgers Meigs (John Rodgers' mother) and her children.

Union Navy officers
United States Navy admirals
People from Havre de Grace, Maryland
1812 births
1882 deaths
Rodgers family
Burials at Oak Hill Cemetery (Washington, D.C.)